Kasmere Lake is a lake in the northwest corner of Manitoba, near the provincial boundaries with Nunavut and Saskatchewan, Canada. It is drained by the Thlewiaza River.

References

Lakes of Manitoba